The Path of Totality Tour was a concert tour in support of Korn's tenth studio album of the same name. The tour kicked off on November 3, 2011 in Boston, Massachusetts. Supporting acts for the first North American leg of the tour were Downlink, Datsik, and Dope D.O.D. Kill the Noise and Sluggo will each open certain dates of the second North American leg; Jonathan Davis' dubstep side project, JDevil, will perform on all dates. Downlink, JDevil, and The Dirty Youth are among the opening acts for the European leg.

The tour is scheduled to continue overseas in Europe on March 12, 2012, following an appearance at the SmokeOut Festival in San Bernardino, California with Cypress Hill.

On May 5, 2012, former guitarist Brian "Head" Welch joined the band onstage for the first time in 7 years at the Carolina Rebellion Festival.

The tour saw its final Leg on December 1, 2012 as part of the Shiprocked Cruise. And it was also Korn's last tour as a quartet before original guitarist Brian Welch returns to the band in 2013

Setlist
{{hidden
| headercss = background: #ddd; font-size: 100%; width: 50%;
| header = North America
| content =
"Predictable"
"Lies"
"No Place to Hide"
"Proud''
"Narcissistic Cannibal"
"Kill Mercy Within"
"My Wall"
"Get Up!"
"Way Too Far"
"Here to Stay"
"Freak on a Leash"
"Falling Away from Me"
"Another Brick in the Wall"

Encore
"Shoots and Ladders" / "One"
"Got the Life"
"Blind"
}}

{{hidden
| headercss = background: #ddd; font-size: 100%; width: 50%;
| header = North America, Leg II
| content =
"Predictable"
"Lies"
"No Place to Hide"
"Helmet in the Bush"
"Narcissistic Cannibal"
"Chaos Lives in Everything"
"My Wall"
"Get Up!"
"Way Too Far"
"Here to Stay"
"Freak on a Leash"
"Falling Away from Me"
"Another Brick in the Wall"

Encore
"Shoots and Ladders" / "One"
"Got the Life"
"Blind"
}}

{{hidden
| headercss = background: #ddd; font-size: 100%; width: 50%;
| header = Europe
| content =
"Predictable"
"Lies"
"No Place to Hide"
"Good God"
"Narcissistic Cannibal"
"Kill Mercy Within"
"Chaos Lives in Everything"
"My Wall"
"Get Up!"
"Way Too Far"
"Here to Stay"
"Freak on a Leash"
"Falling Away from Me"
"Oildale (Leave Me Alone)"
"Another Brick in the Wall"

Encore
"Shoots and Ladders" / "One"
"Got the Life"
"Blind"
}}

{{hidden
| headercss = background: #ddd; font-size: 100%; width: 50%;
| header = North America, Leg III
| content =
"Divine"
"Predictable"
"No Place to Hide"
"Good God"
"Narcissistic Cannibal"
"Kill Mercy Within"
"Chaos Lives in Everything"
"My Wall"
"Get Up!"
"Way Too Far"
"Here to Stay"
"Freak on a Leash"
"Did My Time"
"Falling Away from Me"
"Another Brick in the Wall"

Encore
"Shoots and Ladders" / "One"
"Got the Life"
"Blind"
}}

{{hidden
| headercss = background: #ddd; font-size: 100%; width: 50%;
| header = Europe, Leg II
| content =
"Divine"
"Predictable"
"No Place to Hide"
"Good God"
"Narcissistic Cannibal"
"Kill Mercy Within"
"Chaos Lives in Everything"
"My Wall"
"Get Up!"
"Way Too Far"
"Here to Stay"
"Freak on a Leash"
"Falling Away from Me"
"Another Brick in the Wall"

Encore
"Shoots and Ladders" / "One"
"Got the Life"
"Blind"
}}

Other songs
"Let's Go" was performed once at the Boston show. "Coming Undone" had been listed on the setlist for Boston but it was not performed for unspecified reasons. "Proud" was a staple on the tour's first North American leg; it has since been replaced. "Illuminati" was played during The Path of Totality'''s album release party at the Hollywood Palladium. "Somebody Someone" was played once in Oberhausen, only to be replaced with "Oildale (Leave Me Alone)" at the next show. "Porno Creep" was played at the Indianapolis show, but has since been omitted from the set list, but was played at the Gurgaon show in Delhi, NCR in India.

Jonathan Davis confirmed via video chat that "B.B.K." is performed during rehearsals for the tour but is difficult to pull off live and may be performed in the future.

Tour dates

Broadcasts and recordings
An official release party for The Path of Totality took place on December 6 at the Hollywood Palladium, and featured several producers who worked on the album. This included Skrillex performing "Get Up!" and "Narcissistic Cannibal" on guitar with the band. This event was filmed for a DVD release, which will also be available in 3D and Blu-ray formats. The March 20 show in Amsterdam was specially streamed live on Korn's website and official Facebook page; the stream brought in a staggering 750,000 viewers online and may have a future DVD release.

Korn was scheduled to perform in Los Angeles at the 2012 Revolver Golden Gods Awards on April 11, but the band had to cancel due to Jonathan Davis' knee injury.Korn: The Path of Totality Tour – Live at the Hollywood Palladium was released on DVD and Blu-ray on September 4, 2012 by Shout! Factory.

VIP packages
The tour offered special Limited VIP Packages which will vary in price. Packages available include a Guitar VIP Experience, Double Platinum VIP Experience (fans can choose of three different types: Listing session, Gaming session, or a drum lesson), Platinum VIP Experience, and Gold VIP Experience''.

References

External links

 

2011 concert tours
2012 concert tours
Korn concert tours